The 66th Honinbo began league play on 7 October 2010 and completed on July 21, 2011. Title holder Yamashita Keigo retained his title over challenger Hane Naoki by a score of 4-3.  Yamashita Keigo won the first three games, Hane Naoki the next three, and Yamashita Keigo the final game.

Preliminary tournament
The preliminary tournament started on 8 April 2010. Hane Naoki, Iyama Yuta, Takao Shinji, and Cho U retained their place in the Honinbo league from the 65th Honinbo. These players were joined by the winners of the preliminary tournament: Cho Sonjin, Seto Taiki, O Rissei, and Kobayashi Satoru.

League play
League play commenced on 7 October after the preliminaries, which finished on 2 September. Hane Naoki, who lost the Honinbo title to Yamashita Keigo the year prior, won the right to challenge Keigo for the title.

Finals

References

2011 in go
Go competitions in Japan